Cheyletidae is a family of mites in the order Trombidiformes. Some members are parasites of birds and mammals, causing cheyletiellosis, or "walking dandruff". Others are free-ranging predators which can be found in soil, forest litter, animal nests, and house dust, under tree bark, and on foliage.

References

External links

Joel Hallan's Biology Catalog: Cheyletidae

Trombidiformes
Acari families